The Cold Lake Ice are a junior "B" ice hockey team based in Cold Lake, Alberta, Canada. They are members of the North Eastern Alberta Junior B Hockey League (NEAJBHL). They play their home games at the 1,800-seat Imperial Oil Place, located at the Energy Centre.

Team info
Head coach and general manager is Scott Hood

Championships

The Ice have won three regular season and four playoff championships in their history. The Ice were four-time consecutive playoff champions from 2011–12 to the 2014–15 seasons.

Season stats

2010–11 season

This season saw the Ice reach the league finals for the first time in their history. They beat the Lloydminster Bandits to win the championship and advance to provincials.

2011–12 season

The 2011–12 season saw the Ice finish up in second place during the regular season but surged through the playoffs to repeat as league champions.

2012–13 season

This season saw the Ice complete a three-peat. The best showing to-date at the Russ Barnes Trophy winning the bronze medal with a 5–3 victory over the Red Deer Vipers from the Heritage Junior B Hockey League.

2013–14 season

With the season still under way, the Ice finished the regular season with the best record in team history and finished the season first in the league.  The Ice went on to win their fourth straight NEAJHL playoff championship and another trip to the Russ Barnes Championships.  This season, Cold Lake failed to advance to the playoff round for the Russ Barnes Trophy.

Season-by-season record

Note: GP = Games played, W = Wins, L = Losses, OTL = Overtime Losses, Pts = Points, GF = Goals for, GA = Goals against, PIM = Penalties in minutes

Russ Barnes Trophy
Alberta Jr. B Provincial Championships

Keystone Cup
Western Canadian Jr. B Championships (Northern Ontario to British Columbia)Six teams in round robin play. 1st vs. 2nd for gold/silver & 3rd vs. 4th for bronze.

Awards and trophies
NEAJBHL Championship
 2010–11

Goaltender of the Year
Dustin Hyde: 2010–11

Most Gentlemanly
Sean Joly: 2010–11

Rookie of the Year
Dallas Ansell: 2010–11

See also
List of ice hockey teams in Alberta

External links
Official website of the Cold Lake Ice

Cold Lake, Alberta
Ice hockey teams in Alberta